Bonhamaropa is a genus of air-breathing land snails, terrestrial pulmonate gastropod mollusks in the family  Charopidae. It is found in Australia in Tasmania and Victoria.

References

 Stanisic, J.; Shea, M.; Potter, D.; Griffiths, O. (2018). Australian land snails. Volume 2. A field guide to southern, central and western species. Bioculture Press, Mauritius. 594 pp.

 
Gastropods of Australia
Gastropods described in 2018
Gastropod genera